Półmrok is the second studio album by Polish folk band Tulia. It was released by Universal Music Polska on 21 May 2021.

Półmrok is a combination of folk and alternative rock, and was executive produced by Marcin Kindla. It spawned five singles "Rzeka", "Burza", "Marcowy", "Przepięknie" and "Narkotyk".

Track listing

Release history

References

2021 albums
Polish-language albums
Universal Music Group albums